Doduo is a populated place in Churu district, Bikaner Division, Rajasthan, India.

References

Villages in Churu district